Jo Mango is a British alternative folk and acoustic band from Glasgow. Jo Mango is also the adopted name of the lead singer and primary songwriter of the group.

Jo Mango: lead vocals, rhythm guitar, kalimba, toy piano, concertina
Jim Mango: bass player, backing vocals
Alan Peacock: backing vocals, guitar
Katherine Waumsllaying: flute, piano, kalimba and concertina. Since April 2006 Mango toured extensively in Bunyan's band, throughout North America, Europe, Australia and Japan. At home in the UK she also featured in the Zero Degrees of Separation tour, becoming an integral part of the band which also features Adem, Juana Molina, Vetiver and Vashti Bunyan. This culminated in a Carnegie Hall show in New York in February, curated by David Byrne.

Jo has also appeared as a solo artist playing shows across the globe in countries such as America, Australia and Japan. Her tour of America began with a session on Nic Harcourt's show Morning Becomes Eclectic on Santa Monica's KCRW radio station and a performance at South By South West (SXSW) in Austin, Texas. The Scotland Herald describes Jo Mango's recent EP "When We Lived in The Crook of a Tree" as "[a voice] so hushed and precise, that it sounds as if it were recorded inside your own head" (2013).

Discography

EPs
Antidote (2003)
Fluffy Brain (2004)
The Moth and the Moon / Black Sun (2010)
Wrack Lines (2016 – Jo Mango & Friends)
System Hold (2019 – Jo Mango & Friends)

Studio albums 
Paperclips and Sand (1999)
Murmuration (2012)
Transformuration (2014 - Remixes of Murmuration)

Singles
"My Lung" (2007 - Download Only)

References

External links
The official Jo Mango website 
KCRW.com
 nicharcourt.com
anotherday.co.uk - Vashti Bunyan Official Site

Scottish folk music groups